A boondoggle is a scheme that wastes time and money.

Boondoggle or boon doggle may also refer to:
 Boondoggle (EP), an EP by The Lucksmiths
 Boondoggle (web series), an American comedy web series
 Scoubidou, a knotting and plaiting craft known in the U.S. and Canada as "boondoggle"
 Gimp (thread), a type of thread used in making boondoggles and lanyards
 Woggle, a scout's neckerchief fixing known alternatively as a "boon doggle"